Pinel is the surname of:

 Raquel Pinel, Spanish football forward currently playing for Valencia CF in the Spanish league
 Germain Pinel (c. 1600–1661), French lutenist and composer
 François Pinel (c. 1624-18 May 1709), French lutenist and theorbo player, younger brother of the former
 Louis Pinel, (1820-1889), French Chinese general, went to settle in China, Philippe Pinel's grand-nephew
 Marie-Adélaïde Pinel (1836-1902), French teacher, Louis Pinel's sister, Philippe Pinel's grand-niece and Paul Langevin's mother 
 Marcel Pinel (1908–1968), French footballer
 Suzanne Pinel, CM is a Canadian children's entertainer and citizenship judge
 Julie Pinel (1710–1737), French composer and harpsichord teacher
 Philippe Pinel (1745–1826), French physician